Voltairine de Cleyre (November 17, 1866 – June 20, 1912) was an American anarchist known for being a prolific writer and speaker who opposed capitalism, marriage and the state as well as the domination of religion over sexuality and women's lives which she saw as all interconnected. She is often characterized as a major early feminist because of her views.

Born and raised in small towns in Michigan and schooled in a Sarnia, Ontario, Catholic convent, de Cleyre began her activist career in the freethought movement. Although she was initially drawn to individualist anarchism, de Cleyre evolved through mutualism to what she called anarchism without adjectives, prioritizing a stateless society without the use of aggression or coercion above all else.

De Cleyre was a contemporary of Emma Goldman, with whom she maintained a relationship of respectful disagreement on many issues. Many of de Cleyre's essays were collected in the Selected Works of Voltairine de Cleyre, published posthumously by Goldman's magazine Mother Earth in 1914.

Biography 
Born in the small town of Leslie, Michigan, she moved with her family to St. Johns, Michigan, where she lived with her unhappily married parents in extreme poverty. She came from French-American stock, on her mother's side of Puritan descent. Her father, Auguste de Cleyre, was a native of western Flanders, but his family was of French origin. He named her after the famed French Enlightenment author Voltaire.

At age 12, her father placed her in a Catholic convent school in Sarnia, Ontario, because he thought it would give her a better education than the public schools. This experience resulted in her embracing atheism rather than Christianity. Of her time spent there, she said "it had been like the Valley of the Shadow of Death, and there are white scars on my soul, where ignorance and superstition burnt me with their hell fire in those stifling days". She tried to run away by swimming across the St. Clair River to Port Huron, Michigan and hiking , but she met friends of her family. They contacted her father and sent her back to the convent.

Family ties to the abolitionist movement and the Underground Railroad, the harsh and unrelenting poverty of her childhood, and being named after the philosopher Voltaire all contributed to the radical rhetoric that she developed shortly after adolescence. After schooling in the convent, de Cleyre moved to Grand Rapids, Michigan. She got involved in the strongly anti-clerical freethought movement by lecturing and contributing articles to freethought periodicals, eventually becoming the editor of freethought newspaper The Progressive Age.

During her time in the freethought movement in the mid and late 1880s, de Cleyre was especially influenced by Thomas Paine, Mary Wollstonecraft and Clarence Darrow. Other influences were Henry David Thoreau and labor leaders Big Bill Haywood and Eugene Debs. After the 1887 execution of several Haymarket protesters in Chicago, she became an anarchist. "Till then I believed in the essential justice of the American law of trial by jury", she wrote in an autobiographical essay, "After that I never could".

She was known as an excellent speaker and writer. Biographer Paul Avrich said that she was "a greater literary talent than any other American anarchist". She was also known as a tireless advocate for the anarchist cause whose "religious zeal", according to Emma Goldman, "stamped everything she did."

She became pregnant by James B. Elliot, another freethinker, giving birth to their son Harry on June 12, 1890. As de Cleyre and Elliot agreed, their son lived with Elliot, and de Cleyre had no part in his upbringing. She was close to and inspired by Dyer Lum ("her teacher, her confidant, her comrade", according to Goldman). Her relationship with him ended shortly before he committed suicide in 1893.

De Cleyre based her operations from 1889 to 1910 in Philadelphia, where she lived among poor Jewish immigrants and where sympathy for anarchist beliefs was common. There, she taught English and music and learned to speak and write in Yiddish.

Throughout her life, de Cleyre was plagued by illness. Goldman said that she had "some disease of the nervous system which she had developed in early childhood".

She survived an assassination attempt on December 19, 1902. Her assailant Herman Helcher was a former pupil who had earlier been rendered insane by a fever and whom she immediately forgave as she wrote: "It would be an outrage against civilization if he were sent to jail for an act which was the product of a diseased brain".

Death
De Cleyre died from septic meningitis on June 20, 1912, at St. Mary of Nazareth Hospital in Chicago, Illinois. She is interred near the Haymarket defendants and other social activists at the Waldheim Cemetery (now Forest Home Cemetery) in Forest Park, a suburb west of Chicago. Goldman was later buried in this area of the cemetery as well.

Political beliefs 

De Cleyre changed her political perspective during her life. She eventually became a strong proponent of anarchism without adjectives, according to historian George Richard Esenwein a doctrine "without any qualifying labels such as communist, collectivist, mutualist, or individualist. For others, [...] [it] was simply understood as an attitude that tolerated the coexistence of different anarchist schools". For several years, de Cleyre associated primarily with American individualist anarchism. Distinguishing herself from Emma Goldman and expanding on her support for individualist anarchism, de Cleyre wrote: Miss Goldman is a communist; I am an individualist. She wishes to destroy the right of property, I wish to assert it. I make my war upon privilege and authority, whereby the right of property, the true right in that which is proper to the individual, is annihilated. She believes that co-operation would entirely supplant competition; I hold that competition in one form or another will always exist, and that it is highly desirable it should.

Despite their early dislike for one another, de Cleyre and Goldman came to respect each other intellectually. In her 1894 essay "In Defense of Emma Goldman and the Right of Expropriation", de Cleyre wrote in support of the right of expropriation: I do not think one little bit of sensitive human flesh is worth all the property rights in N. Y. city. [...] I say it is your business to decide whether you will starve and freeze in sight of food and clothing, outside of jail, or commit some overt act against the institution of property and take your place beside Timmermann and Goldmann.

Eventually, de Cleyre embraced social anarchism over individualism. In 1908, she argued "that the best thing ordinary workingmen or women could do was to organise their industry to get rid of money altogether" and "produce together, co-operatively rather than as employer and employed". In 1912, she said that the Paris Commune's failure was due to its having "respected [private] property". In her essay "The Commune Is Risen", she states: "In short, though there were other reasons why the Commune fell, the chief one was that in the hour of necessity, the Communards were not Communists. They attempted to break political chains without breaking economic ones". She became an advocate of anarchism without adjectives, writing in The Making of an Anarchist: "I no longer label myself otherwise than as 'Anarchist' simply".

Some observers and scholars dispute whether de Cleyre's rejection of individualism constituted an embrace of pure communism. Goldman and Rudolf Rocker asserted that position, but others, including de Cleyre's biographer Paul Avrich, have not agreed. In response to claims that she had been an anarcho-communist, de Cleyre said in 1907: "I am not now, and have never been at any time, a communist". Anarchist scholar Iain McKay argues that de Cleyre's subsequent 1908 advocacy of a moneyless economy was technically a form of communism, even if she rejected the word communist to describe it.

In her 1901 essay entitled Anarchism, de Cleyre wrote: My ideal would be a condition in which all natural resources would be forever free to all, and the worker individually able to produce for himself sufficient for all his vital needs, if he so chose, so that he needs not govern his working or not working by the times and seasons of his fellows. I think that time may come; but it will only be through the development of the modes of production and the taste of the people. Meanwhile, we all cry with one voice for the freedom to try.

"Direct Action", her 1912 essay in defense of direct action, is widely cited today. In this essay, de Cleyre points to examples such as the Boston Tea Party, noting that "direct action has always been used, and has the historical sanction of the very people now reprobating it".

In her 1895 lecture entitled Sex Slavery, de Cleyre condemns ideals of beauty that encourage women to distort their bodies and child socialization practices that create unnatural gender roles. The title of the essay refers not to traffic in women for purposes of prostitution, although that is also mentioned, but rather to marriage laws that allow men to rape their wives without consequences. Such laws make "every married woman what she is, a bonded slave, who takes her master's name, her master's bread, her master's commands, and serves her master's passions".

De Cleyre adamantly opposed the government maintaining a standing army, arguing that its existence made wars more likely. In her 1909 essay "Anarchism and American Traditions", she argued that in order to achieve peace "all peaceful persons should withdraw their support from the army, and require that all who wish to make war do so at their own cost and risk; that neither pay nor pensions are to be provided for those who choose to make man-killing a trade".

Legacy 

As one of the few women of stature in the anarchist movement, de Cleyre was acclaimed by Emma Goldman as "the most gifted and brilliant anarchist woman America ever produced". She is not widely known today, which biographer Sharon Presley attributes to the shortness of her life.

Since the late 20th century, there has been renewed interest in her. An American Anarchist: The Life of Voltairine de Cleyre, written by Paul Avrich, was published by the Princeton University Press in 1978. A collection of her speeches, The First Mayday: The Haymarket Speeches, 1895–1910, was published by the Libertarian Book Club in 1980. In 2004, AK Press released The Voltairine de Cleyre Reader. In 2005, two more collections of her speeches and articles were published, namely Exquisite Rebel: The Essays of Voltairine De Cleyre – Anarchist, Feminist, Genius, edited by Presley and Crispin Sartwell and published by SUNY Press; and Gates of Freedom: Voltairine De Cleyre and the Revolution of the Mind, from University of Michigan Press. Her papers are held at the YIVO Institute for Jewish Research in New York City. In 2018, The New York Times published a belated obituary for her.

See also 

 Bill Haywood
 Dyer D. Lum
 Emma Goldman
 Eugene V. Debs
 Haymarket affair
 Henry David Thoreau
 Rachelle Yarros
 The writing on the wall influenced de Cleyre's Written in Red

References

Bibliography

Further reading 

 
 Palczewski, Catherine Helen. 1995. "Voltairine de Cleyre: Sexual Slavery and Sexual Pleasure in the Nineteenth Century". NWSA (National Women's Studies Association) Journal, Vol. 7, No. 3 (Autumn 1995), pp. 54–68.

External links 

 Voltairine.org. . Website about Voltairine de Cleyre, including articles and biography.
 
 
 
 
 
 
 Poems by Voltairine De Cleyre from the Daily Bleed
 De Cleyre, Voltairine (1894). "In Defense of Emma Goldman and the Right of Expropriation".
 Voltairine de Cleyre at the Molinari Institute
 
 Voltairine de Cleyre at Panarchy

1866 births
1912 deaths
19th-century American essayists
19th-century American non-fiction writers
19th-century American women writers
19th-century atheists
20th-century American essayists
20th-century American women writers
20th-century atheists
American anarchists
American anti-capitalists
American anti-war activists
American atheists
American libertarians
American women essayists
American women non-fiction writers
American women philosophers
Anarcha-feminists
Anarchist theorists
Anarchist writers
Anarchists without adjectives
Burials at Forest Home Cemetery, Chicago
Deaths from meningitis
Free love advocates
Freethought writers
Individualist feminists
Left-libertarians
Libertarian socialists
Neurological disease deaths in Illinois
Infectious disease deaths in Illinois
People from Leslie, Michigan
People from St. Johns, Michigan
Philosophy writers
Sex-positive feminists
American socialist feminists
Writers from Chicago
Writers from Philadelphia